Steven Evans (born September 19, 1991) is a former American professional soccer player.

Career

Early career
Born in Portland, Oregon, Evans began his soccer career at Eastside United FC, which won the U.S. Youth Soccer U-18 national championship in 2010. He also was an all-state player for Portland's Central Catholic High School where he helped guide the Rams to a 2007 6A State Championship. In 2010 Evans started to attend the University of Portland for which he played for their school soccer team, the Portland Pilots, where he stayed for three seasons. While with the Pilots Evans earned the 2010 WCC Freshman of the Year award his first year, All-West Coast Conference selection all three seasons, and All-WCC First Team his final two years. In his final season with the Pilots Evans managed a career-best 14 goals which was ranked 8th amongst the NCAA.

During the summer months, Evans played for the Portland Timbers U23s in the USL Premier Development League who he started playing for in 2009. While with the Timbers U23s Evans assisted on the game-winning goal in the final match of the 2010 PDL season against the Thunder Bay Chill as the Timbers won the championship match that season 4–1 in an undefeated season for the under-23s.

Portland Timbers
On January 8, 2013 it was officially announced that Evans had been signed by the Portland Timbers on a homegrown player contract. Evans became the second homegrown player at the club after Brent Richards who signed in 2012. On December 8, 2014, Evans's option was declined for 2015 and signed a contract with Portland Timbers 2, the Timbers' USL Pro club.

Coaching

After 2015, Evans retired from playing, and returned to the University of Portland as an assistant coach..  He since has become a youth soccer coach in the Portland metro area.

Personal life
Steven's younger brother, Nick, played varsity soccer for Central Catholic HS and for the Portland Timber's u-16 team. Nick won a state championship his junior year. He now plays at Concordia University-Portland. Their father formerly coached at Eastside Timbers FC and coached Steven at Eastside.

Career statistics

References

External links 
 

1991 births
Living people
American soccer players
Association football midfielders
Central Catholic High School (Portland, Oregon) alumni
Homegrown Players (MLS)
Portland Pilots men's soccer players
Portland Timbers players
Portland Timbers 2 players
Portland Timbers U23s players
Sacramento Republic FC players
Soccer players from Portland, Oregon
United States men's under-20 international soccer players
USL Championship players
USL League Two players